The 2011–12 season of Majstrovstvá regiónu was the nineteen season of the fourth-tier football league in Slovakia, since its establishment in 1993.

64 teams were geographically divided into four groups: Majstrovstvá regiónu Bratislava, Majstrovstvá regiónu Západ, Majstrovstvá regiónu Stred and Majstrovstvá regiónu Východ (16 teams each). Teams were played against teams in their own division only.

Majstrovstvá regiónu Bratislava

League table

Majstrovstvá regiónu Západ

Locations

League table

Majstrovstvá regiónu Stred

League table

Majstrovstvá regiónu Východ

Locations

League table

References

External links 
 Slovak site Denník Šport 

4
4
Slovak
4. Liga (Slovakia) seasons